The R623 road is a regional road in County Cork, Ireland. It is a loop road on Little Island from the N25.

References

Regional roads in the Republic of Ireland
Roads in County Cork